Albert Schmidt may refer to:

 Albert Schmidt (monk) (born 1949), German Benedictine monk, abbot and theologian
 Albert-Marie Schmidt (1901–1966), French classicist and literary scholar 
 Albert Smidt (c. 1847–1890), German-born Australian serial killer

See also
 Albert Schmid (1920–1982), United States Marine